Pszenno  is a village in the administrative district of Gmina Świdnica, within Świdnica County, Lower Silesian Voivodeship, in south-western Poland.

The most notable sights of the village include the medieval Saint Nicholas church and a museum dedicated to sugar production, which is located at the local sugar refinery.

History

In 1243 the village was established within fragmented Piast-ruled Poland under so-called German Law under Johann Graf von Wuerben.

The Polish name comes from the word pszenica, which means wheat, while the German name Weizenrodau literally means wheat uprooting. The ancestors of the Watzenrode family of Prussia based their family name on the village since this is where they originated.

Since 1645, the Evangelical inhabitants of the town belonged to the Church of Peace in nearby Świdnica, while, until 1773, the Catholics belonged to the Jesuit Church of Świdnica. The village was annexed by Prussia in 1741, and was administratively located in the Świdnica County (then Landkreis Schweidnitz) since. A sugar factory was established in the village in the early 19th century. 

From 1871 to 1945 it was also part of Germany. In 1874 the local civil registry was established. During World War II the Germans operated the E12001 forced labour subcamp of the Stalag VIII-B/344 prisoner-of-war camp in the village. After Germany's defeat in the war, in 1945, the village became again part of Poland.

Economy
There is a sugar refinery in the village.

Transport
The Polish National road 35 runs through the village.

Education
The Nicolaus Copernicus Elementary School (Szkoła Podstawowa im. Mikołaja Kopernika) is located in Pszenno.

Sports
The local football club is Cukrownik Pszenno. It competes in the lower leagues.

Famous residents
Watzenrode Family went from the village to Toruń (then Thorn) in the 1350s.
birthplace of the mother of astronomer Nicolaus Copernicus

References

External links
A 17th century Map of Silesia (Wissenroda) north of Schweidnitz
A very detailed 1883 German Aerial Map of Weizenrodau and surrounding towns etc. from the Prussian Government with later updates and stamps of Polish take-over administration after 1945

Villages in Świdnica County
13th-century establishments in Poland